Outlook: Canada's Progressive Jewish Magazine  was an independent, secular Jewish periodical published six times a year and based in Vancouver, British Columbia.

Founded in 1963 as the Canadian Jewish Outlook, an English supplement to the Yiddish newspaper The Vochenblatt, the publication had a "socialist-humanist" perspective. It received support from the United Jewish Peoples Order though it was not formally affiliated with it. Outlook was the only Canadian publication devoted to yiddishkeit, Jewish ethical humanism and Israeli-Palestinian peace and justice issues.

The magazine adopted its shortened name in 1986. In 1988 The Canadian Jewish Outlook Anthology, a collection of articles, editorials and reviews carried in the magazine during its first twenty-five years was published with Henry Rosenthal and Cathy Berson as editors.

The magazine's circulation peaked at 3,000 in the 1990s but had declined to 500 by 2016. It was based first in Toronto with Joshua Gershman as publisher and de facto editor until his death in 1978 and, since 1979 in Vancouver where it was edited by Hank Rosenthal, Ben Chud and Sylvia Friedman, and since 1998 by Carl Rosenberg and Friedman. After a run of 52 years, it ceased publication with its Spring 2016 issue.

References

External links
 Official website

1962 establishments in Ontario
2016 disestablishments in British Columbia
Ashkenazi Jewish culture in Toronto
Bi-monthly magazines published in Canada
Defunct political magazines published in Canada
Independent magazines
Jewish magazines
Jewish socialism
Jews and Judaism in Vancouver
Magazines established in 1962
Magazines disestablished in 2016
Magazines published in Toronto
Magazines published in Vancouver
Newspaper supplements
Religious magazines published in Canada
Secular Jewish culture in Canada
Socialist magazines
Yiddish culture in Canada
Jewish mass media in Canada